The Pleasant Green Cemetery is located in the Oquirrh Mountains above Magna, Utah. Approximately 1,400 persons are buried in the cemetery. Many religious leaders and settlers of the western side of the Salt Lake Valley, particularly many leaders of the Church of Jesus Christ of Latter-day Saints (LDS Church) lie in the cemetery. The Pleasant Green Cemetery was established because Daniel Jacob's grandmother died in 1883 and the only large cemetery at the time in the valley was the Salt Lake City Cemetery. Daniel and his friends got together and founded the Pleasant Green Cemetery and Sarah Haines was the first person buried in the cemetery.

History 
The Pleasant Green Cemetery was founded in 1883 by Daniel Jacobs, Hiram Spencer, Samual Taylor, George Perkins, Osmond LeCheminant, and maybe James Berotch, and Lehi Nephi Hardman, the Bishop of the Pleasant Green Ward, of the LDS Church. Bishop Hardman became the Custodian of the Cemetery. The land was donated by Nathan Smith, who owned 160 acres in the area.  Many of the original founders of the western Salt Lake Valley Towns, including Magna, Hunter, Pleasant Green, Ragtown, and Coonville are buried here.

These include pioneers from the Coon, Bertoch, LeCheminant, Rushton, Hardman, Staker, and Taylor families.

The LDS Church cared for and owned the cemetery from 1883–1983.  In 1983, the Church formed a nonprofit, known as The Pleasant Green Cemetery Preservation And Development Association.  The Church turned ownership and care of the cemetery over to this nonprofit which has managed it ever since. The Cemetery was turned over to the Magna Metro Township in 2020.

Burials 

Originally graves in this cemetery were sold in lots of 16.  The LDS Church charged $20 for 16 graves.  That price was later increased to $50 per grave.  In the 1980s cemetery management began selling graves one at a time instead of in lots of 16.  In the 1990s the price of graves was increased to $425.  In 2012 the price was $500.

It is estimated by the cemetery that there are approximately 17,000 grave sites, of which 1,400 are currently occupied.

Nonprofit 
Pleasant Green Cemetery is a nonprofit cemetery, which is operated and maintained by volunteers

Management 
The Pleasant Green Cemetery is managed by The Pleasant Green Cemetery Preservation And Development Association, a nonprofit which was created by the LDS Church.  In 2012, the sexton was Hiram Bertoch.In May 2020, the ownership was transferred to the Magna Metro Township.

References

External links
 

1883 establishments in Utah Territory
Buildings and structures in Salt Lake County, Utah
Cemeteries in Utah